Cheyne Beach Whaling Station is a defunct whaling station in Australia. It now operates as a tourist park known as Albany's Historic Whaling Station, and has previously also been known as Whaleworld or Whale World. The station is situated in Frenchman Bay in King George Sound and was built in the 1950s, operating until 1978.

History
Whalers had been recorded at Cheynes Beach in the 1840s with a commercial fishing operation being established there in 1920. Whaling recommenced there in the early 1950s and the Cheynes Beach Whaling Company was formed by a family syndicate of eight fishermen. The syndicate was headed by two Albany men, G. R. Birss and C. Westerberg, who expected to outlay £20,000 on the venture. The business was relocated to the Frenchman Bay site shortly afterward.

Quotas were set for humpback whales in 1951, but the station was established at the Frenchman Bay site in 1952. The industrial facility was built to process whales caught in the area and is composed of a number of large steel and concrete sheds and workshops, smaller timber-framed offices and amenities buildings along with tanks and boilers. Much of the station was constructed from old mining equipment along with an alcohol distillation plant from Collie. The flensing deck was built over a natural rock slipway with steam winches installed further up the shore to haul the carcasses onto the deck. The initial quota for the first year was 50 humpback whales.

The oil was loaded aboard the Norwegian boat Toulouse ferried by the chaser Cheynes from the station to the boat.

The oil had an estimated worth of £100,000.

The company slowly continued to grow and in 1957 purchased a second chaser Kos VII.

Following a disastrous season in 1962 with record low catches the International Whaling Commission ended whaling of humpbacks from Antarctic stocks so the company commenced hunting sperm whales instead. The enterprise remained profitable with the company recording a net profit of 100,362 in 1969 that grew to 304,329 in 1970. The higher profits were due to a record catch of sperm whales at the station, 764 in total, and unprecedented world demand for oil. The company employed over 100 staff, and the oil was being used by NASA and to make Swiss watches. Whaling continued from the station until 1978 when the last whale was legally caught in Australian waters.

A total of 1136 humpbacks and 14,695 sperm whales were caught from the station between 1952 and 1978.

The Cheynes Beach Whaling Company closed in 1978 and the site was given to Jaycees Community Foundation in 1980. The Foundation converted the station to a museum named Whaleworld using government and private funding. Whaleworld was officially opened in May 1985. The current name of the museum is Albany's Historic Whaling Station.

See also
The Last Whale
Whaling in Australia
Whaling in Western Australia

Australian Wildlife Park Albany

The Australian Wildlife Park Albany located adjacent to the Cheyne Beach Whaling Station Museum is a  wildlife park which offer close up experiences with native animals such as: Southern Hairy-nosed wombat, Koalas, Brushtail possums (including rare golden-coated individuals), Quenda bandicoots, Spotted-tailed quoll, Red kangaroos, Western grey kangaroos (including rare albino individuals), Euro wallaroos, Tammar wallabies, Bennet wallabies, Tasmanian pademelons, Long-nose potoroos, Rufus bettongs, Brush-tail bettongs (Woylie), Stimson's python, Lizards, Tawny frog mouth, Brush tone curlew, Owls, Rufus night heron and Major Mitchell cockatoos.

References

External links

Whaling stations in Australia
Whaling in Australia
Heritage places in Albany, Western Australia
1952 establishments in Australia
1978 disestablishments in Australia
Maritime museums in Australia
Tourist attractions in Western Australia
State Register of Heritage Places in the City of Albany